FBFC (Franco-Belge de Fabrication du Combustible, French-Belgian fabrication of fuel) is a nuclear fuel producing company. From 1977 onwards its  headquarters are located in Romans-sur-Isère. It operates a further two facilities, one at the Tricastin Nuclear Power Center in France and one Dessel in Belgium. In 2001 FBFC became a wholly owned subsidiary of Areva. Since 2018, FBFC is a subsidiary of Framatome. In Dessel FBFC employs around 150 people.

Areva
Nuclear fuel companies
Nuclear technology in Belgium
Nuclear technology companies of France
2001 mergers and acquisitions